National Route 485 is a national highway of Japan connecting Okinoshima, Shimane and Matsue, Shimane in Japan, with a total length of .

References

485
Roads in Shimane Prefecture